McKee Run is a tributary of the Beaver River in western Pennsylvania.  The stream rises in south-central Lawrence County and flows west entering the Beaver River at West Pittsburg, Pennsylvania. The watershed is roughly 29% agricultural, 62% forested and the rest is other uses.

See also
List of rivers of Pennsylvania

References

Rivers of Pennsylvania
Tributaries of the Beaver River
Rivers of Lawrence County, Pennsylvania
Allegheny Plateau